Ansha may refer to:

Chinese towns
 Ansha, Yong'an (安砂镇), a town of Yong'an city in Fujian province
 Ansha, Changsha (安沙镇), a town of Changsha County in Hunan province

Other uses
 Ansha (footballer), Indian footballer